Arctoseius tschernovi is a species of mite in the family Ascidae. It is found in Europe.

References

Ascidae
Articles created by Qbugbot
Animals described in 2000